In combinatorial mathematics, a q-exponential is a q-analog of the exponential function,
namely the eigenfunction of a q-derivative. There are many  q-derivatives, for example, the classical  q-derivative, the Askey-Wilson operator, etc. Therefore, unlike the classical exponentials, q-exponentials are not unique.  For example,  is the q-exponential corresponding to the classical  q-derivative while   are eigenfunctions of the Askey-Wilson operators.

Definition
The q-exponential  is defined as

where  is the q-factorial and 

is the q-Pochhammer symbol. That this is the q-analog of the exponential follows from the property

where the derivative on the left is the q-derivative. The above is easily verified by considering the q-derivative of the monomial

Here,  is the q-bracket.

Properties
For ,  is regular in the disk .

Note the inverse,  .

Addition Formula
However, if these are operators satisfying the commutation relation , then  holds true.

Relations
For  , a function that is closely related is   It  is a special case of the basic hypergeometric series,

Clearly,

Relation with Dilogarithm
 has the following infinite product representation:

On the other hand,  holds. 
When ,

By taking the limit ,

where  is the dilogarithm.

In physics 

The Q-exponential function is also known as the quantum dilogarithm.

References

 
 
 
 
 
 
 

Q-analogs
Exponentials